The International Cultic Studies Association (ICSA) is a non-profit educational and anti-cult organization. ICSA's mission is to provide information, education, and help to those adversely affected by or interested in cultic and other high-control groups and relationships. It publishes the International Journal of Coercion, Abuse, and Manipulation, "ICSA Today", and other materials.

History
ICSA was founded in 1979 in Massachusetts as the American Family Foundation (AFF) – one of several dozen disparate parents' groups founded in the late 1970s by concerned parents. For a time it was affiliated with the Citizens’ Freedom Foundation (CFF) which later became the Cult Awareness Network (CAN). It also developed links with Christian counter-cult movements such as the Christian Research Institute. In December 2004, it changed its named from American Family Foundation to International Cultic Studies Association.
.

Publications

Print magazines 
In 1984, the American Family Foundation's early print magazine, The Advisor, was replaced by the Cult Observer and the Cultic Studies Journal.

Cultic Studies Review 
In 2001, publication of the Cultic Studies Journal ceased, and the AFF began publishing the Cultic Studies Review as an online journal with triennial print editions. In 2005, the final AFF published edition of Cultic Studies Review was released. Subsequent editions were published by the International Cultic Studies Association until 2010.

International Journal of Cultic Studies 
In 2010, the first print and online editions of the International Journal of Cultic Studies (IJCS) were published online, as a self-described "refereed annual journal that publishes scholarly research on cultic phenomena across a range of disciplines and professions".

Former Australian MP Stephen Mutch has served on the journal's editorial board.

Reception

Connections with post-communist governments

Bryan Edelman and James T. Richardson state that China has borrowed heavily from Western anti-cult movements, such as ICSA, to bolster their view of non-mainstream religious groups, and so the support campaigns of oppression against them. In a previous article Richardson and Marat S. Shterin said that Western anti-cult organizations, including the CSA, had been a source of anti-cult material in Russia.

Criticism
In their book, Cults and New Religions: A Brief History, sociologists Douglas E. Cowan and David G. Bromley describe the ICSA as a "secular anticult" organization. They point out that the ICSA provides no indication of how many of their characteristics are necessary for a group to be considered "cultic". The checklist creators do not adequately define how much of certain practices or behaviors would constitute "excessive", nor do they provide evidence that any of the practices listed are innately harmful. Finally, Cowan and Bromley criticize the ICSA list as being so broad that even mainstream organizations such as Buddhism, Evangelical Protestantism, Hinduism, and the Roman Catholic Church fall within the criteria.

References 

Anti-cult organizations
International organizations based in the United States
International religious organizations
Organizations based in Florida